Events from the year 1992 in Canada.

Incumbents

Crown 
 Monarch – Elizabeth II

Federal government 
 Governor General – Ray Hnatyshyn 
 Prime Minister – Brian Mulroney
 Chief Justice – Antonio Lamer (Quebec) 
 Parliament – 34th

Provincial governments

Lieutenant governors 
Lieutenant Governor of Alberta – Gordon Towers
Lieutenant Governor of British Columbia – David Lam
Lieutenant Governor of Manitoba – George Johnson 
Lieutenant Governor of New Brunswick – Gilbert Finn 
Lieutenant Governor of Newfoundland – Frederick Russell 
Lieutenant Governor of Nova Scotia – Lloyd Crouse 
Lieutenant Governor of Ontario – Hal Jackman 
Lieutenant Governor of Prince Edward Island – Marion Reid 
Lieutenant Governor of Quebec – Martial Asselin 
Lieutenant Governor of Saskatchewan – Sylvia Fedoruk

Premiers 
Premier of Alberta – Don Getty (until December 14) then Ralph Klein 
Premier of British Columbia – Mike Harcourt 
Premier of Manitoba – Gary Filmon 
Premier of New Brunswick – Frank McKenna 
Premier of Newfoundland – Clyde Wells 
Premier of Nova Scotia – Donald Cameron 
Premier of Ontario – Bob Rae 
Premier of Prince Edward Island – Joe Ghiz 
Premier of Quebec – Robert Bourassa 
Premier of Saskatchewan – Roy Romanow

Territorial governments

Commissioners 
 Commissioner of Yukon – John Kenneth McKinnon 
 Commissioner of Northwest Territories – Daniel L. Norris

Premiers 
Premier of the Northwest Territories – Nellie Cournoyea
Premier of Yukon – Tony Penikett (until November 7) then John Ostashek

Events

January to June
January: CBC Television's documentary series The Valour and the Horror is criticized by Canadian veterans' groups for reportedly misrepresenting Canadian military conduct during World War II.
January 22: On STS-42, Dr. Roberta Bondar becomes the first Canadian woman in space.
 February 6: Ruby Jubilee of Elizabeth II's accession as Queen of Canada
April 5: The Iranian embassy in Ottawa is stormed by members of MEK, an Iraq-supported religious right group.
April 16 to 19: Abduction and murder of Kristen French.
May: Geological Survey of Canada expedition measures elevation of Mount Logan to 5,959 m.
May 7: Three employees are murdered and one permanently disabled during a robbery at a McDonald's restaurant in Sydney River, Nova Scotia.
May 9: 26 miners are killed in the Westray Mine Disaster.
May 17: Official opening of celebrations of the 350th anniversary of Montreal.

July to September
July 1:
Celebrations of the 125th anniversary of Confederation.
The Van Doos launch a successful operation to secure control of Sarajevo's airport.
Snowdrift, Northwest Territories, is renamed Łutselkʼe
July 2: a two-year shutdown of the cod fishery is announced.
August 8: During the Guns N' Roses/Metallica Stadium Tour, Metallica frontman and guitarist James Hetfield suffers second and third-degree burns during the band's concert at Olympic Stadium in Montreal. A riot broke out after Guns N' Roses singer Axl Rose complained of throat problems and called off the band's set after just 55 minutes.
August 12: the details of North American Free Trade Agreement (NAFTA) are released.
August 22: The final draft of the Charlottetown Accord, a proposed package of constitutional amendments, is released.
August 24: A mechanical engineering professor, Valery Fabrikant, opens fire at Concordia University in Montreal killing four people.
September 4: Nine workers at the Giant Mine are killed after striking employee Roger Warren detonates a bomb in the mine shaft.

October to December
October: The ban on homosexuals in the Canadian military is lifted, following a legal challenge by Michelle Douglas.
October 19: Yukon elections: John Ostashek's YP wins only a minority.
October 24: The Toronto Blue Jays defeat the Atlanta Braves, 4 games to 2, winning their first World Series Title and becoming the first Canadian team to win the World Series. 
October 26: The Charlottetown Accord is rejected in a nationwide referendum.
October 28: The 1992 Manitoba municipal elections take place.
November 5: A referendum endorsing the creation of Nunavut is successful in the Northwest Territories.
November 7: John Ostashek becomes government leader of the Yukon, replacing Tony Penikett.
December 15: The first members of the Canadian Airborne Regiment arrive in Somalia on an ill-fated humanitarian mission.
December 16: Ralph Klein succeeds Don Getty as Premier of Alberta.
December 17: Prime Minister Brian Mulroney signs the NAFTA deal.

Full date unknown
 Rudolph A. Marcus wins the Nobel Prize for Chemistry.
 Agriculture Canada introduces a national BSE prevention program.
 Delwin Vriend, an Alberta teacher, wins a court case against the Alberta Human Rights Commission regarding the status of LGBT persons under the province's human rights legislation. The case was appealed to the Alberta Court of Appeal; see 1994 in Canada.
 Charles de Gaulle Obelisk, Montreal unveiled.
 Remsoft, an asset management software provider is founded.

Arts and literature

New books 
The English Patient: Michael Ondaatje
Tales from Firozsha Baag: Rohinton Mistry
Inkorrect thots: bill bissett
Mother, not mother: Di Brandt

Awards
Michael Ondaatje's The English Patient wins the Booker Prize, the first Canadian to do so.
See 1992 Governor General's Awards for a complete list of winners and finalists for those awards.
Books in Canada First Novel Award: Rohinton Mistry, Such a Long Journey
Gerald Lampert Award: Joanne Arnott, Wiles of Girlhood
Pat Lowther Award: Kate Braid, Covering Rough Ground
Marian Engel Award: Joan Barfoot
Stephen Leacock Award: Roch Carrier, Prayers of a Very Wise Child
Trillium Book Award: Michael Ondaatje, The English Patient
Vicky Metcalf Award: Kevin Major

Music
Alanis, Now Is the Time
Barenaked Ladies, Gordon
Beau Dommage, Beau Dommage au Forum
Blue Rodeo, Lost Together
Bootsauce, Bull
La Bottine Souriante, Jusqu'aux p'tites heures
Bourbon Tabernacle Choir, Superior Cackling Hen
The Box, Decade of the Box
Change of Heart, Smile
Leonard Cohen, The Future
Cowboy Junkies, Black Eyed Man
54-40, Dear Dear
Front Line Assembly, Tactical Neural Implant
Hart-Rouge, Le dernier mois de l'année
hHead, Fireman
Intermix, Intermix
Jr. Gone Wild, Pull the Goalie
Lava Hay, With a Picture in Mind
Leslie Spit Treeo, Book of Rejection
Martha and the Muffins, Modern Lullaby
Moxy Früvous, Moxy Früvous
Sarah McLachlan, Live EP
The Northern Pikes, Neptune
The Nylons, Live to Love
The Rankin Family, Fare Thee Well Love
Rheostatics, Whale Music
Jane Siberry, A Collection 1984–1989 and Summer in the Yukon
Skydiggers, Restless
Sloan, Peppermint and Smeared
The Tragically Hip, Fully Completely
The Waltons, Lik My Trakter
The Watchmen, mclarenfurnaceroom

Television
August 28 : The last episode of the children's series The Raccoons on CBC Television

Sport
February 8–February 23 – 1992 Winter Olympics are held in Albertville, France. Canada finishes ninth in the medal count.
May 17 – The Kamloops Blazers win their first Memorial Cup by defeating the Sault Ste. Marie Greyhounds 5 to 4. 
June 1 – Montreal's Mario Lemieux of the Pittsburgh Penguins wins his second consecutive Conn Smythe Trophy
July 25–August 9 – Canada competes in the 1992 Summer Olympics.
October 8 – The new Ottawa Senators are established and become the National Hockey League's eighth Canadian team. They defeat the Montreal Canadiens at the Ottawa Civic Centre in their first game back
October 24 – The Toronto Blue Jays become the first Canadian team to win the World Series by defeating the Atlanta Braves 4 games to 2. 
November 21 – The Queen's Golden Gaels win their third Vanier Cup by defeating the St. Mary's Huskies 31 to 0 in the 28th Vanier Cup
November 29 – The Calgary Stampeders win their third Grey Cup by defeating the Winnipeg Blue Bombers 24 to 10 in the 80th Grey Cup played at SkyDome in Toronto. Toronto's own Dave Sapunjis is awarded the Most Valuable Canadian for the second consecutive Cup.

Births

January to March
January 1 – Freddie Hamilton, hockey player
January 7 – Erik Gudbranson, hockey player
January 11 
Laysla De Oliveira, actress
Mark Pysyk, hockey defenceman
January 21 – Quinton Howden, hockey player
January 27 – Connor Widdows, actor
January 31 – Tyler Seguin, professional ice hockey winger
February 9 – Avan Jogia, actor
February 12 – Amanda Laine, model
February 18 
Brandon Gormley, hockey defenceman
Melinda Shankar, actress
March 8 – Julien Collin-Demers, short track speed skater
March 23 – Vanessa Morgan, actress and singer

April to June 
April 1 – Gabriela Dabrowski, tennis player
April 2 – John McFarland, hockey player
April 5 – Emmalyn Estrada, singer
April 11 – Victoria Hayward, softball player
April 15 – Calvin Pickard, professional ice hockey goaltender
April 20 – Dylan McIlrath, hockey defenceman
April 24 – Joanna Lenko, ice dancer
April 27 – J.P. Anderson, hockey goaltender
April 29 – Sarah Freeman, junior alpine skier
May 2 – Brett Connolly, hockey player
May 5 – Antoine Gélinas-Beaulieu, short track speed skater
May 6 – Brendan Gallagher, ice hockey player
May 7 – Alexander Ludwig, actor
May 13 – Keltie Hansen, freestyle skier
May 14 – A.J. Saudin, actor
May 16 – Jeff Skinner, hockey player
May 18 – Laurie Kingsbury, ice hockey player
May  
Aaron Brown, sprinter
Laurence Vincent-Lapointe, canoeist
May 31 – VanossGaming, Youtuber
June 4 – Savannah King, swimmer
June 23 – Louis-Philippe Dury, actor
June 25 – Jaden Schwartz, hockey player

July to December
July 1 – Andrew Chalmers, actor
July 4 – Chris Haughton, cadet olympic recurve archer
July 24 – Mikaël Kingsbury, freestyle skier
July 27 – Tory Lanez, rapper
July 31 – Ryan Johansen, hockey player
August 7 – Mark Visentin, hockey player
August 9 – Burkely Duffield, actor
August 29 – Carolyn MacCuish, figure skater
September 3 – Nicholas Lindsay, soccer player
September 19 – Kelsey Balkwill, athlete
September 28 – Keir Gilchrist, actor
October 5 – Eric Cabral, actor
October 6 – Josh Archibald, ice hockey player
October 17 – Mikaël Grenier, racing driver
October 28 – Zack Phillips, ice hockey player 
November 4 – Josh Janniere, soccer player
November 22 – Natalie Achonwa, basketball player
November 28 – Cameron Ansell, actor
December 5 – Natalie Sourisseau, field hockey player
December 7 – Sean Couturier, hockey player
December 11 – Dalton Pompey, baseball player
December 21
 Andrew Chalmers, teen actor
 Haylee Wanstall, actress

Deaths

January to March
February 1 – Gary Lautens, humorist and newspaper columnist (born 1928)
February 5 – Maxwell Meighen, financier (born 1908)
February 25 – Louis Harrington Lewry, politician and reporter (born 1919)
February 27 – S. I. Hayakawa, academic and politician (born 1906)
March 3 – Robert Beatty, actor (born 1909)
March 14 – Bill Allum, ice hockey player (born 1916)
March 26 – Barbara Frum, radio and television journalist (born 1937)

April to June
April 10 – Cec Linder, actor (born 1921)
April 15 – Mud Bruneteau, professional ice hockey forward who player (born 1914)
April 19 – Kristen French, murder victim (born 1976)
May 9 – James Allan, politician (born 1894)

July to December
July 5 – Pauline Jewett, politician and educator (born 1922)
July 11 – Munroe Bourne, swimmer (born 1910)
July 24 – Sam Berger, lawyer, businessman and football player  (born 1900)
July 30 – Joe Shuster, comic book artist (born 1914)
September 3 – Émile Benoît, musician (born 1913)
September 14 – Paul Martin Sr., politician (born 1903)
September 27 – Hugh Llewellyn Keenleyside, diplomat, civil servant and 5th Commissioner of the Northwest Territories (born 1898)
November 4 – George Klein, inventor (born 1904)
December 13 – K. C. Irving, entrepreneur and industrialist (born 1899)
December 28 – Pudlo Pudlat, artist (born 1916)

Full date unknown
Greg Curnoe, painter (born 1936)

See also
 1992 in Canadian television
 List of Canadian films of 1992

References

 
Years of the 20th century in Canada
Canada
1992 in North America